Talar (also Romanized as Ţālār; also known as Talvār) is a village in Howmeh Rural District, in the Central District of Minab County, Hormozgan Province, Iran. At the 2006 census, its population was 421, in 80 families.

References 

Populated places in Minab County